Uljaste may refer to several places in Estonia:

Uljaste, Ida-Viru County, village in Sonda Parish, Ida-Viru County
Lake Uljaste, lake near Sonda
Uljaste, Lääne-Viru County, village in Rägavere Parish, Lääne-Viru County